Jill Dawson (born 8 April 1962) is an English poet and novelist who grew up in Durham, England. She began publishing her poems in pamphlets and small magazines. Her first book, Trick of the Light, was published in 1996. She was the British Council Writing Fellow at Amherst College for 1997.

Bibliography
School Tales: Stories by Young Women (editor), Women's Press, 1990, 
The Virago Book of Wicked Verse (editor), Virago Press, 1992, 
White Fish with Painted Nails, Slow Dancer Press, 1990; Slow Dancer Press, 1994, 
How Do I Look?, Virago Press, 1990, 
The Virago Book of Love Letters (editor), Virago Press, 1994, 
Kisses on Paper, Faber and Faber, 1994, 
Trick of the Light, Sceptre, 1997, 
Magpie, Sceptre, 1998, 
Wild Ways: New Stories about Women on the Road (editor with Margo Daly), Hodder & Stoughton, 1998, 
Fred and Edie, Sceptre, 2000; Houghton Mifflin Harcourt, 2002, 
Gas and Air: Tales of Pregnancy and Birth (editor with Margo Daly), Bloomsbury Publishing, 2002
Wild Boy, Sceptre, 2003, 
Watch Me Disappear, Sceptre, 2006, 
The Great Lover  Sceptre, 2009, ; HarperCollins, 2010, 
Lucky Bunny, Sceptre, 2011, 
The Crime Writer, Sceptre, 2016, 
The Language of Birds, Sceptre, 2019, 
The Bewitching, Sceptre, 2022,

Awards
Awards which Dawson has received recognition from include:

1984 First prize in City Limits short story competition
1984 First Prize in Hackney New Writers Competition (judged by Michelene Wandor)
1992 Eric Gregory Award for poetry
1995 Joint first prize Sheffield Hallam short story competition (judged by Margaret Drabble and Hanif Kureishi)
1995 Blue Nose Poet of the Year
1995 Author's Fund Award
1996 Kathleen Blundell Award
1996 London Arts Board New Writer Award for Magpie
2000 Short list for Whitbread Novel of the Year for Fred & Edie
2001 Short list for Orange Prize for Fred & Edie
2001 Long-list of Dublin IMPAC Award for Fred & Edie
2001 ScreenEast Award for Stunner screenplay.
2003 Arts Council England Award for Half of England (Watch Me Disappear)
2004 Wild Boy becomes the first ever novel to be long-listed for the British Academy Book Prize 
2006 ScreenEast award for Watch Me Disappear screenplay.
2006 Watch Me Disappear long-listed for the Orange Prize
2006 Arts Council Award
2008 Arts Council Award for The Silver Banks
2016 East Anglian Book of the Year (Fiction) for The Crime Writer

References

External links
 Official website
 Jill Dawson at Foyles.

Living people
English women poets
English women novelists
1962 births